Helder José Ina de Carvalho (born 4 August 1966) is an Angolan judoka. He competed in the men's heavyweight event at the 1988 Summer Olympics.

References

External links
 

1966 births
Living people
Angolan male judoka
Olympic judoka of Angola
Judoka at the 1988 Summer Olympics
Sportspeople from Luanda
African Games medalists in judo
African Games bronze medalists for Angola
Competitors at the 1987 All-Africa Games